Norwalk Seminary was a private, Methodist school in Norwalk, Ohio.  Opening in 1838 with Edward Thomson as principal, by 1842 it had an attendance of nearly four hundred.  Nonetheless, the school was unsuccessful financially, and it was forced to close in 1844.  In 1846, a Baptist church purchased the building and re-opened it under the name Norwalk Institute.  There were about three hundred students when, in 1855, the school was transferred to the Ohio public school system.  Renamed again as Central High School, the building continued to be used as a public school until 1868, when a new structure replaced it.

Notable alumni
 Henry Beadman Bryant
 William Logan Harris
 Rutherford B. Hayes, President of the United States
 Mary Bigelow Ingham, educator, writer, social reformer
 George E. Seney
 Orville James Victor, writer and editor

Sources

Defunct Christian schools in the United States
Defunct schools in Ohio
Educational institutions established in 1838
1838 establishments in Ohio
Educational institutions disestablished in 1844
1844 disestablishments in the United States